Václavík (Czech and Slovak feminine: Václavíková) is a surname. Notable people include:

 Adam Václavík (born 1994), Czech biathlete
 Ivan Václavík (born 1971), Slovak footballer
 Jan Václavík (born 1985), Czech volleyball player
 Josef Václavík (1900–1973), Czech architect
 Lucie Václavíková (born 1967), Czech volleyball player
 Michal Václavík (born 1976), Czech footballer
 Milán Václavík (1928–2007), Slovak military officer
 Rastislav Václavik (born 1997), Slovak footballer

See also
 

Czech-language surnames